Mark Leon Medlock (born 9 July 1978) is a German singer and the winner of the season 4 of Deutschland sucht den Superstar (DSDS), the German version of Pop Idol.

Early life
Medlock is the elder of two siblings, born to an African-American father from Georgia, Larry Medlock, and a German mother, Monika, in Frankfurt am Main. Mark and his brother Larry were raised in a semi-poor home in the Lohwaldsiedlung neighborhood of Offenbach am Main during their formative years, before eventually moving to the Lauterborn neighborhood in 1997. At the age of 6, Medlock began singing gospel, widely influenced by his father and soul singers such as James Brown and Barry White.

At the end of the 1990s, his mother fell sick with cancer. Medlock subsequently left school and cared for her until her death in 2000. Two years later, his father died of a heart attack. In the meantime Medlock made a living with various jobs, including employment as a geriatric orderly, gardener, swamper, and garbage remover.

Deutschland sucht den Superstar
Medlock was one of the favorite contestants right from the beginning of the competition. He had wowed the audience and the judges with his first performance in the Top 20 motto show and so on to the final. Medlock eventually won the competition with 78.02% of the votes against Martin Stosch who originally placed fourth but returned because of Max Buskohl's withdrawal.

Medlock is next to season five winner Thomas Godoj the second contestant of all German seasons who always gained the majority of vote calls during any of the nine theme shows and the two Top 20 shows. He is also one of two winners who was revealed to have never been in the bottom three during the competition, as well as being the first multiracial winner.

Performances

Discography 

Mr. Lonely (2007)
Dreamcatcher (joint album with Dieter Bohlen; 2007)
Cloud Dancer (2008)
Club Tropicana (2009)
Rainbow's End (2010)
My World (2011)
Im Nebel (2014)
Zwischenwelten (2017)

References

External links 

 Official site of Mark Medlock
 Radio Comedy at 1live.de

1978 births
German people of African-American descent
People from Offenbach am Main
Deutschland sucht den Superstar winners
21st-century German male singers
German LGBT singers
German gay musicians
Gay singers
English-language singers from Germany
Living people